The GeForce 16 series is a series of graphics processing units developed by Nvidia, based on the Turing microarchitecture, announced in February 2019. The 16 series, commercialized within the same timeframe as the 20 series, aims to cover the entry-level to mid-range market, not addressed by the latter. As a result, the media have mainly compared it to AMD's Radeon RX 500 series of GPUs.

Architecture 

The GeForce 16 series is based on the same Turing architecture used in the GeForce 20 series, omitting the Tensor (AI) and RT (ray tracing) cores exclusive to the 20 series. The 16 series does, however, retain the dedicated integer cores used for concurrent execution of integer and floating point operations. On March 18, 2019, Nvidia announced that via a driver update in April 2019 they would enable DirectX Raytracing on 16 series cards starting with GTX 1660, together with certain cards in the 10 series, a feature reserved to the RTX series up to that point.

Products 
The GeForce 16 series launched on February 23, 2019, with the announcement of the GeForce GTX 1660 Ti. The cards have a PCIe 3.0 x16 interface, which connects them to the CPU, produced with TSMC's 12 nm FinFET process. On April 22, 2019, coinciding with the announcement of the GTX 1650, Nvidia announced laptops equipped with built-in GTX 1650 chipsets. TU117 does not support Nvidia Optical Flow, which is useful for motion interpolation software. All TU117 GPUs use Volta's NVENC encoder (which has a marginally better improvement over Pascal) instead of Turing's.

Desktop

Laptop

Reception

GTX 1630 
Following its June 2022 release, the GTX 1630 received negative reviews. A two-star review by Jarred Walton in Tom's Hardware criticised its price, especially considering that it was released 3 years after most of the 16 series, while only performing better than the GTX 1050. Walton wrote that "the only real contender for the GTX 1630 is AMD's recently launched Radeon RX 6400, but this new Nvidia card actually makes the lackluster 6400 look good". He concluded that "no one should give the GTX 1630 the time of day" and instead recommended the GTX 1650 and 1650 Super for their dramatically improved specs and performance for a similar price. TechSpot characterized the GTX 1630's specs as a "cutdown version of the GTX 1650" from April 2019 which is "3-year-old silicon that to put it mildly was pretty pathetic back then". Jacob Roach of Digital Trends noted that the GTX 1630 released in 2022 was outperformed by an AMD Radeon RX 470 from 2016.

GTX 1650 
Tom's Hardware criticized the GTX 1650, noting that the 8GB variant of the RX 570 is "faster, less expensive and better able to handle games with big memory requirements."

Forbes described the GTX 1650 as "a tempting choice for a super-small and power-efficient gaming PC". However, "when it comes to value and bang for your buck, AMD's RX 570 is the clear choice overall."

GTX 1650 Super 
PC Gamer described the GTX 1650 Super as a "no-brainer" and a "super easy recommendation" over the original 1650, as it only costs $10 more and is "consistently around 30 percent faster". However, they criticized the small amount of VRAM (4GB) and noted that users who have a PC which does not have PCIe power cables available have to "stick with the vanilla 1650" because the Super variant has a higher power consumption (75W vs 100W). Altogether, it has a "great overall value" and for now "claims the crown for best budget graphics card", being consistently faster than the RX 580 and coming close to the RX 590 when the VRAM is not a limiting factor.

GTX 1660 Super 
They found that the GTX 1660 Super "almost makes the 1660 Ti look redundant" and noted that "it outperforms anything AMD currently offers in the same price range", being "about 20 percent faster than the RX 590".

See also 
 GeForce 10 series
 GeForce 20 series
 GeForce 30 series
 GeForce 40 series
 Nvidia Quadro
 Nvidia Tesla
 List of Nvidia graphics processing units

References

External links 
Official website

Computer-related introductions in 2019
Graphics processing units
1600 Series
Graphics cards